The 1998 United States Senate election in Arkansas was held on November 3, 1998. Incumbent Democratic Senator Dale Bumpers chose to retire instead of running for reelection to a fifth term. Making this was the first open seat with no incumbent held in this seat since the 1884 election. Democratic nominee and former U.S. Representative Blanche Lincoln won the open seat against Republican State Senator Fay Boozman. In the 2010 election, Lincoln would be defeated in her bid for reelection to a third term by Fay Boozman's younger brother John Boozman. At 38, Lincoln was the youngest woman ever elected to the United States Senate.

Democratic primary

Candidates 
 Winston Bryant, Attorney General of Arkansas, former lieutenant governor, former Secretary of State of Arkansas and nominee for the U.S. Senate in 1996
 Nate Coulter, Democratic nominee for Lieutenant Governor in 1993
 Blanche Lincoln, former U.S. Representative
 Scott Ferguson, radiologist and State Representative

Withdrew 
 Pat Hays, Mayor of North Little Rock

Results

Republican primary

Candidates 
 Fay Boozman, State Senator
 Tom Prince, Mayor of Little Rock

Results

General election

Candidates 
 Blanche Lincoln (D), U.S. Representative
 Fay Boozman (R), State Senator
 Charley Heffley (Reform)

Results

See also 
 1998 United States Senate elections
 2002 United States Senate election in Arkansas
 2008 United States Senate election in Arkansas

References 

1998
United States Senate
Arkansas